The 1939 Navy Midshipmen football team represented the United States Naval Academy during the 1939 college football season. In their first season under head coach Swede Larson, the Midshipmen compiled a 3–5–1 record and were outscored by their opponents by a combined score of 107 to 88.

Schedule

References

Navy
Navy Midshipmen football seasons
Navy Midshipmen football